The Chief Justice of Tasmania is the senior judge of the Supreme Court of Tasmania, and the highest ranking judicial officer in the Australian state of Tasmania. The Chief Justice is both the judicial head of the Supreme Court as well as the administrative head. They are responsible for arranging the business of the court and establishing its rules and procedures. The current Chief Justice is Alan Blow, who was appointed in 2013 by then Governor Peter Underwood who himself had been a Chief Justice of the Supreme Court. Blow CJ had been a puisne justice of the court since 2000.

List of chief justices of Tasmania

See also
 Judiciary of Australia
 Supreme Court of Tasmania

References

 
Lists of judges of Australian superior courts